Xinghaiornis is an extinct genus of toothless basal ornithothoracine dinosaur known from the Early Cretaceous Yixian Formation (Aptian stage) of western Liaoning Province, northeastern China. Xinghaiornis was first named by Xuri Wang, Luis M. Chiappe, Fangfang Teng and Qiang Ji in 2013 and the type species is Xinghaiornis lini. Xinghaiornis was prepared by Maureen Walsh at the Dalian Museum of Prehistory, Dalian, China.

References

Prehistoric avialans
Bird genera
Early Cretaceous birds of Asia
Fossil taxa described in 2013
Paleontology in Liaoning